Maciej Piaszczyński (born 28 May 1989 in Pleszew, Poland) is an international speedway rider who has represented Poland U-21 national team.

Career details

World Championships 
 Individual U-21 World Championship:
 2007 - 11th place (4 pts) in Qualifying Round 4
 2009 - Lost in Domestic Qualifications
 Team U-21 World Championship:
 2007 - 10 points in Qualifying Round

European Championships 
 Individual U-19 European Championship:
 2007 -  Częstochowa - 16th place (1 pt)

Domestic competitions 
 Individual Polish Championship
 2008 - 10th place in Quarter-Final 3
 2009 - 16th place in Quarter-Final 2
 Individual U-21 Polish Championship:
 2007 - 6th place
 2008 - 12th in Semi-Final 1
 2009 - 10th place in Qualifying Round 2
 Team Polish Championship (Polish League):
 2006 with PSŻ Milion Team Poznań in 3rd division - CMA 6.71
 2007 with PSŻ Milion Team Poznań 5th place in 2nd division - CMA 5.75
 Polish Silver Helmet (U-21):
 2007 -  Rybnik - 4th place
 2008 - 10th place in Semi-Final 2
 2009 -  Częstochowa - 16th place (1 pt)
 Polish Bronze Helmet (U-19):
 2006 -  Opole - 7th place
 2007 -  Gorzów Wlkp. - 15th place
 2008 -  Gdańsk - 16th place (3 pts)
 U-21 Individual Championship of Greater Poland:
 2005 - 2nd place
 2006 - 5th place
 2007 - 2nd place
 U-21 Team Championship of Greater Poland:
 2005 - Champion
 2007 - Champion

See also 
 Poland national speedway team

References

External links 
 Official website

1989 births
Living people
Polish speedway riders
People from Pleszew
Sportspeople from Greater Poland Voivodeship